Lajos Pósa may refer to:
 Lajos Pósa (writer) (1850–1914), Hungarian writer and poet
 Lajos Pósa (mathematician) (born 1947), Hungarian mathematician and educator